In grammar, parallelism, also known as parallel structure or parallel construction, is a balance within one or more sentences of similar phrases or clauses that have the same grammatical structure. The application of parallelism affects readability and may make texts easier to process.

Parallelism may be accompanied by other figures of speech such as antithesis, anaphora, asyndeton, climax, epistrophe, and symploce.

Examples
Compare the following examples:

All of the above examples are grammatically correct, even if they lack parallelism: "cooking", "jogging", and "to read" are all grammatically valid conclusions to "She likes", for instance. The first nonparallel example has a mix of gerunds and infinitives. To make it parallel, the sentence can be rewritten with all gerunds or all infinitives. The second example pairs a gerund with a regular noun. Parallelism can be achieved by converting both terms to gerunds or to infinitives. The final phrase of the third example does not include a definite location, such as "across the yard" or "over the fence"; rewriting to add one completes the sentence's parallelism.

In rhetoric

Parallelism is often used as a rhetorical device. Examples:

"The inherent vice of capitalism is the unequal sharing of blessings. The inherent virtue of Socialism is the equal sharing of miseries." — Winston Churchill, House of Commons, 22 October 1945 
"Let every nation know, whether it wishes us well or ill, that we shall pay any price, bear any burden, meet any hardship, support any friend, oppose any foe to assure the survival and the success of liberty." — John F. Kennedy, Presidential Inaugural Address
"...and that government of the people, by the people, for the people, shall not perish from the earth." — Abraham Lincoln, Gettysburg Address
"We have petitioned, and our petitions have been scorned; we have entreated, and our entreaties have been disregarded; we have begged, and they have mocked when our calamity came. We beg no longer; we entreat no more; we petition no more. We defy them." — William Jennings Bryan, Cross of Gold speech

See also
Foregrounding
Prosody (linguistics)
Repetition (rhetorical device)

References

External links
Faulty Parallelism, Nipissing University

Grammar
Rhetoric